Willrich is a surname. Notable people with the surname include:

Chris Willrich (born 1967), American science fiction and fantasy writer
Jean Willrich (born 1953), German-American soccer player
Michael Willrich, American historian
Penny Willrich, American lawyer, academic administrator, and judge
Wolfgang Willrich (1897–1948), German artist